Joseph Clifton Wiggins (September 19, 1906 – October 25, 1984), also known as "Joe Chevalier", and nicknamed "Jumping Joe", was an American Negro league third baseman in the 1930s.

Early life and career
A native of Dinwiddie County, Virginia, Wiggins attended Virginia State University, Atlanta University, and Fisk University. He made his Negro leagues debut in 1930 for the Nashville Elite Giants, and played for several teams through 1934. Wiggins died in Cleveland, Ohio in 1984 at age 78.

References

Further reading
 Jones, 'Melancholy' (March 20, 1932). "Sportopics: Joe Wiggins on Hot Corner Again". Atlanta Daily World.
 Courier staff (June 25, 1932). "Ex-College Star Helps Balto. Beat Daisies". The Pittsburgh Courier.

External links
 and Baseball-Reference Black Baseball stats and Seamheads

1906 births
1984 deaths
Bacharach Giants players
Baltimore Black Sox players
Cleveland Cubs players
Nashville Elite Giants players
New York Black Yankees players
20th-century African-American sportspeople
Baseball infielders